Geoffrey Wagner (born 1927) is an English–American scholar and writer. He has published numerous books exploring subjects such as feminism in literature, the life and work of English writer Wyndham Lewis, and the consequences of the Grenadian Revolution. Wagner is a professor emeritus of English and the Humanities at the City College of New York.

Life and education 
Born in England in 1927, Wagner earned a degree from the college of Christ Church at Oxford University. In 1948, the writer met his future wife, the magical realist painter Colleen Browning, while on vacation in the Gulf of Naples. Nine months later, the couple married and moved to the United States, eventually settling in New York City, where Wagner taught at the City College of New York.

Work

Non-fiction 
Wagner has written several non-fiction books and translated works of the French writer Charles Baudelaire into English.

List of non-fiction books 

 Parade of Pleasure: A Study of Popular Iconography in the U.S.A. (1955)
 On the Wisdom of Words (1968)
 Language and Reality: A Semantics Approach to Writing (1974)
 The Novel and Cinema (1975)
 The End of Education (1976)

Fiction 

 The Asphalt Campus (1963)
 The Sands of Valor (1967)
 Axel (1968) 
 Innocent Grove (1971)
 A Singular Passion (1994)

Wagner has also published writings in numerous American and British publications, including The Hudson Review and The Atlantic.

References 

City College of New York faculty
Living people
1927 births
Alumni of Christ Church, Oxford
20th-century American writers
21st-century American writers
British emigrants to the United States